Klapperichimorda is a genus of beetles in the family Mordellidae, containing the following species:

 Klapperichimorda kodadai Horák, 1996
 Klapperichimorda lutevittata Fan & Yang, 1995
 Klapperichimorda quadrimaculata Ermisch, 1968

References

Mordellidae